Labeoninae is a doubtfully distinct subfamily of ray-finned fishes in the family Cyprinidae of order Cypriniformes. They inhabit fresh water and the largest species richness is in the region around southern China, but there are also species elsewhere in Asia, and some members of Garra and  Labeo are from Africa. They are a generally very apomorphic group, perhaps the most "advanced" of the Cyprinidae. A common name for these fishes is labeonins (when considered a distinct subfamily) or labeoins (when included in subfamily Cyprininae).

They include the group sometimes separated as Garrinae, but these do not seem to be that distinct. In fact, the entire Labeoninae is merged into the Cyprininae by a number of authors; in any case, these two and the former "Barbinae" form a close-knit group whose internal phylogeny is far from resolved. If the subfamily is considered distinct, it is typically split in the tribes Labeonini (which are able to swim well in open water) and Garrini (which are mostly benthic), and sometimes in addition the Banganini (which are somewhat intermediate in habitus) If the labeo lineage is included in the Cyprininae, it becomes the tribe Labeonini, while its two (or three) subdivisions are the subtribes Labeoina, Garraina and perhaps Banganina.

Notable genera are Crossocheilus, Epalzeorhynchos and Garra, which contain some of the popular aquarium fishes often called "algae eaters", e.g. the Siamese algae-eater (Crossocheilus siamensis). Labeo – the type genus of this subfamily – contains many sizeable species which are often used as food.

Anatomically, the labeonins are distinguished by the Weberian apparatus contacting the skull with the supraneural bones, and its basioccipital process being concave in cross-section. The first vertebra has a parapophysis that is elongated to forward and partially overlaps the basioccipital process. The fourth vertebra, meanwhile, has a short but stout transverse process that is prominently elongated bellywards; the os suspensorium is often hidden behind if viewed from the side. In the skull, the frontal and sphenotic bones have prominent foramina. In the anal fin, the first pterygiophore is elongated and has well-developed anterior and posterior flanges, with the former very large and concave at the distal end. Most labeonins have the skinny flap of the underside of the snout well-developed into a fleshy cap that at least partially hides the upper lip except when feeding, and a similar structure at the lower lip.

Genera
Tribe Labeonini
 Barbichthys Bleeker, 1860
 Cirrhinus Oken (ex. Cuvier), 1817 (tentatively placed here)
 Henicorhynchus Smith, 1945
 Labeo – typical labeos
 Labiobarbus van Hasselt, 1823 (including Dangila?)
 Nukta Hora, 1942
 Osteochilus Günther, 1868
 Prolixicheilus Zheng, Chen & Yang, 2016 
 Pseudogyrinocheilus Fang, 1933 
 Schismatorhynchos Bleeker, 1855
 Sinilabeo Rendahl, 1932
Tribe Banganini (might belong in Labeonini)
 Bangana Hamilton, 1822 (tentatively placed here)
 Lobocheilos (tentatively placed here)
 Qianlabeo Zhang & Chen, 2004
 Speolabeo Kottelat, 2017
 Vinalabeo Nguyen, Nguyen & Nguyen, 2016 

Tribe Garrini
 Balantiocheilos (tentatively placed here)
 Crossocheilus van Hasselt, 1823
 Discocheilus Zhang, 1997
 Discogobio Lin, 1931 (tentatively placed here)
 Discolabeo Fowler, 1937
 Epalzeorhynchos
 Garra – garras
 Hongshuia Zhang, Xin & Lan, 2008
 Horalabiosa Silas, 1954
 Iranocypris
 Longanalus Li, 2006 (tentatively placed here)
 Mekongina Fowler, 1937
 Parasinilabeo Wu, 1939
 Paracrossochilus Popta, 1904
 Pseudocrossocheilus Zhang & Chen, 1997
 Ptychidio Myers, 1930
 Rectoris Lin, 1933 (tentatively placed here)
 Semilabeo Peters, 1880 (tentatively placed here)
 Sinocrossocheilus Wu, 1977
 Tariqilabeo Wu, 1977
 Typhlogarra
 Vinagarra Nguyen & Bui, 2010

The supposed genus "Tylognathus", commonly placed in the Labeonini (or Labeoina), is actually a polyphyletic assemblage containing diverse labeonins and some other cyprinids. Its type species, variously called "Tylognathus diplostoma" or "Tylognathus valenciennesii", is actually Bangana diplostoma; most of its other species are now in Lobocheilos.

Footnotes

References

  (2007): Evolutionary origin of Lake Tana's (Ethiopia) small Barbus species: indications of rapid ecological divergence and speciation. Anim. Biol. 57(1): 39-48.  (HTML abstract)
  (2008): Molecular phylogenetics of the family Cyprinidae (Actinopterygii: Cypriniformes) as evidenced by sequence variation in the first intron of S7 ribosomal protein-coding gene: Further evidence from a nuclear gene of the systematic chaos in the family. Mol. Phylogenet. Evol. 46(3): 818–829.  PDF fulltext
  (2007): An overview of labeonin relationships and the phylogenetic placement of the Afro-Asian genus Garra Hamilton, 1922 (Teleostei: Cyprinidae), with the description of five new species of Garra from Ethiopia, and a key to all African species. Zool. J. Linn. Soc. 150(1): 41-83.  PDF fulltext